Leigh Magar is a milliner in Charleston, South Carolina and the owner of Magar Hatworks. She makes a range of custom hats from simple fedoras to more elaborate and theatrical ones, such as those worn at the Kentucky Derby. Her work is sold at Barneys and Tokyo retailer Isetan. Her husband, Johnny Tucker, is an architect. 

Magar grew up in Spartanburg and began sculpting in high school. She enrolled in the millinery program at the Fashion Institute of Technology in Manhattan, New York City, "where she financed her studies by working as a live-in housekeeper and assisting Harlem, New York hatmaker Rod Keenan" and then moved back to Charleston in 1996. After a while she opened an atelier on upper King Street, producing work for high-end retailers and custom work for locals (and local celebrities like Christina Aguilera and Michael Stipe. She was named women's entrepreneur of 2009 by Country Living.

References

External links
 Magar Hat Works website
 "Hat fashion tops it all off for this designer" from The Post and Courier

Year of birth missing (living people)
Living people
People from Spartanburg, South Carolina
Businesspeople from Charleston, South Carolina
Fashion Institute of Technology alumni
American milliners